Stevo Crvenkovski (March 18, 1947 in Skopje – February 4, 2004 in Skopje) was a diplomat from the Republic of North Macedonia. He served as foreign minister of the Republic  from 1993 to 1996 and continued serving as an ambassador to several countries until his death.

1947 births
2004 deaths
Diplomats from Skopje
Deputy Prime Ministers of North Macedonia
Foreign Ministers of North Macedonia
Ambassadors of North Macedonia to the United Kingdom
Social Democratic Union of Macedonia politicians
Politicians from Skopje